Marty Long is an American politician. He serves as a Republican member for the 124th district of the Kansas House of Representatives.

In 2018, Long was elected for the 124th district of the Kansas House of Representatives. He succeeded Steve Alford. He assumed office in 2019.

References 

Living people
Place of birth missing (living people)
Year of birth missing (living people)
Republican Party members of the Kansas House of Representatives
21st-century American politicians